Tomáš Jablonský (born 21 June 1987) is a Czech football player who plays for FC Slavoj Vyšehrad on loan from 1. FK Příbram. 

Previously a left midfielder, Slavia coach Karel Jarolím moved him into defence in 2008. In June 2009, Jablonský was transferred, along with Jan Kovařík, to Jablonec in a deal that sent Adam Hloušek to Slavia Prague.
On 19 January 2017 he signed a one-and-half year contract with FC Zbrojovka Brno. After his spell at Brno, he retired from professional football. However, 14 months after his retirement, he signed a two-year deal with 1. FK Příbram and returned to Czech First League football.

Honours

Club
Slavia Praha
 Czech First League (2): 2007–08, 2008-09

Slovan Bratislava
 Slovak Super Cup (1): 2014

Jablonec
 Czech Cup (1): 2012–13

References

External links
 
 
 
 

1987 births
Living people
Czech footballers
Czech expatriate footballers
Czech Republic under-21 international footballers
FC Zbrojovka Brno players
SK Slavia Prague players
SK Kladno players
FK Jablonec players
ŠK Slovan Bratislava players
Bohemians 1905 players
1. FK Příbram players
FK Slavoj Vyšehrad players
Czech First League players
Czech National Football League players
Slovak Super Liga players
Czech expatriate sportspeople in Slovakia
Expatriate footballers in Slovakia
Association football midfielders
Association football defenders
Footballers from Prague